Jorge Nicolás Higuaín (born 8 June 1957) is an Argentine former footballer who played as a central defender. During his playing career, he played for Boca Juniors, River Plate, San Lorenzo and Stade Brestois 29, at that time in French top division.

Biography
Higuaín is married to Nancy Zacarías, an artist with whom he has four sons: Nicolás, Federico, Gonzalo and Lautaro. His two middle sons followed in their father's footsteps as professional footballers and began their careers at River Plate. As of 2020, both Federico and Gonzalo currently play as forwards for the Major League Soccer team Inter Miami CF.

References

1957 births
Footballers from Buenos Aires
Argentine footballers
Argentine people of Basque descent
Association football central defenders
Nueva Chicago footballers
Club de Gimnasia y Esgrima La Plata footballers
San Lorenzo de Almagro footballers
Boca Juniors footballers
Stade Brestois 29 players
Club Atlético River Plate footballers
Club Atlético Banfield footballers
Argentine expatriate footballers
Argentine Primera División players
Ligue 1 players
Expatriate footballers in France
Argentine expatriate sportspeople in France
Living people
Atlético Tucumán managers